Manulea pygmaeola, the pigmy footman, is a moth of the family Erebidae. It is found in the western half of the Palearctic realm, east to Altai.

The wingspan is 24–28 mm. There is one generation per year with adults on wing from June to August.

The larvae feed on various species of lichen on rocks and wooden poles. Larvae are found from August to June. The species overwinters in the larval stage.

Subspecies
Manulea pygmaeola pygmaeola
Manulea pygmaeola banghaasi (Seitz, 1910) (Asia Minor, Transcaucasia)
Manulea pygmaeola pallifrons (Zeller, 1847) (north-western Africa, Europe, Crimea, Caucasus)
Manulea pygmaeola saerdabense (Daniel, 1939) (western Kopet Dagh, northern Iran, Mountains of eastern Central Asia)

References

External links

Eilema pygmaeola on Fauna Europaea
Eilema pygmaeola on Lepiforum e.V.

Lithosiina
Moths described in 1847
Moths of Europe
Moths of Asia
Taxa named by Henry Doubleday